Pieter Kloppenburg (18 September 1896 – 21 January 1972) was a Dutch cyclist. He competed in two events at the 1920 Summer Olympics.

See also
 List of Dutch Olympic cyclists

References

External links
 

1896 births
1972 deaths
Dutch male cyclists
Olympic cyclists of the Netherlands
Cyclists at the 1920 Summer Olympics
Cyclists from Amsterdam
20th-century Dutch people